Mumtaz Shahnawaz (1912–1948) was a Pakistani diplomat and writer. She had held degrees in English literature.

Family
She was born to Arain  family of Mian Shahnawaz and his politically active wife, Begum Jahanara Shahnawaz. Thus, she was the granddaughter of Sir Muhammad Shafi, the influential leader from Punjab.

Pakistan Movement
Like her mother, Mumtaz Shahnawaz was drawn into the national movement as a Congress member but slowly shifted her sympathies towards to the Muslim League. Mumtaz or Tanzee as she was known to her family and friends was greatly influenced by Jinnah. Mumtaz Shahnawaz died at the age of 35 in a plane crash months after the creation of Pakistan, en route to New York to represent Pakistan at the UN General Assembly, the first woman in Asia to preside over a legislative session.

Literary skills

Her novel, The Heart Divided was probably the first novel on the theme of the partition of India. It tells the story of a Muslim family in North India during the 1940s. It provides a detailed account of Independence and Partition, though it stops short of the Partition riots.

Death
Shahnawaz died in 1948 in the crash of Pan Am Flight 1-10, leaving behind a first draft, which her family published in the edited form 11 years later.

See also
 Arain
 Mian Family Baghbanpura

References
 

Pakistan Movement
Pakistani diplomats
Pakistani writers
1948 deaths
1912 births
Mian family
Victims of aviation accidents or incidents in Ireland
Victims of aviation accidents or incidents in 1948